Feed-in electricity tariffs (FiT) were introduced in Germany to encourage the use of new energy technologies such as wind power, biomass, hydropower, geothermal power and solar photovoltaics. Feed-in tariffs are a policy mechanism designed to accelerate investment in renewable energy technologies by providing them remuneration (a "tariff") above the retail or wholesale rates of electricity. The mechanism provides long-term security to renewable energy producers, typically based on the cost of generation of each technology. Technologies such as wind power, for instance, are awarded a lower per-kWh price, while technologies such as solar PV and tidal power are offered a higher price, reflecting higher costs.

As of July 2014, feed-in tariffs range from 3.33 ¢/kWh (4.4 ¢/kWh) for hydropower facilities over 50 MW to 12.88 ¢/kWh (17.3 ¢/kWh) for solar installations on buildings up to 30kWp and 19 ¢/kWh (25.5 ¢/kWh) for offshore wind.

On 1 August 2014, a revised Renewable Energy Sources Act or EEG (2014) (colloquially called EEG2.0) entered into force.  The government will now stipulate specific deployment corridors to control the uptake of renewables and the feed-in tariffs themselves will be determined by auction.

The aim is to meet Germany's renewable energy goals of 40 to 45% of electricity consumption in 2025 and 55% to 60% in 2035.  The policy also aims to encourage the development of renewable technologies, reduce external costs, and increase security of energy supply.

In the first half of 2014, 28.5% of gross electricity production in Germany came from renewable sources.  The Federal Environment Ministry estimated that renewables were to save 87 million tonnes of carbon dioxide by 2012. The average level of feed-in tariff was 9.53 ¢/kWh in 2005 (compared to an average cost of displaced energy of 4.7 ¢/kWh).  In 2004, the total level of reallocated EEG surcharges was €2.4 billion, at a cost per consumer of 0.56 ¢/kWh (3% of household electricity costs). By 2013, the figure had risen to €20.4 billion. The tariffs are lowered every year to encourage more efficient production of renewable energy. By 2014, the EEG surcharge – which pays for the additional costs through feed-in tariffs – had increased to 6.24 ¢/kWh. As of July 2014, the regular reductions (degressions) were 1.5% per year for electricity from onshore wind and 1% per month for electricity from photovoltaics.

The solar sector employed about 56,000 people in 2013, a strong decline from previous years, due to many insolvencies and business closures. 
Although most of the installed solar panels are nowadays imported from China, the Fraunhofer institute ISEestimates, that only about 30% of the EEG apportionment outflows to China, while the rest is still spent domestically. The institute also predicts that Germany's solar manufacturing sector will improve its competitive situation in the future.

Progression of solar PV FiTs before 2012 

The feed-in tariff system has been modified frequently. The feed-in tariff, in force since 1 August 2004, was modified in 2008. In view of the unexpectedly high growth rates, the depreciation was accelerated and a new category (>1000 kWp) was created with a lower tariff. The facade premium was abolished. In July 2010, the Renewable Energy Sources Act was again amended to reduce the tariffs by a further 16% in addition to the normal annual depreciation, as the prices for PV panels had dropped sharply in 2009.  Another modification of the EEG occurred in 2011, when part of the degression foreseen for 2012 was brought forward to mid-2011 as a response to unexpectedly high installations in the course of 2010.

The support duration is 20 years plus the year of project commissioning, constant remuneration.  Feed-in tariffs was lowered repeatedly (decreasing by 9% default and a maximum of 24% per year).  Degression will be accelerated or slowed down by three percentage points for every 1000 MWp/a divergence from the target of 3500 MWp/a.

Progression of Solar PV FiTs since 2012 

As of July 2014, feed-in tariffs for photovoltaic systems range from 12.88 ¢/kWh for small roof-top system, down to 8.92 ¢/kWh for large utility scaled solar parks. Also, FiTs are restricted to PV system with a maximum capacity of 10MWp. The feed-in tariff for solar PV is declining at a faster rate than for any other renewable technology.

Renewable Energy Sources Act (2014) 

On 1 August 2014, a revised Renewable Energy Sources Act entered into force.  Specific deployment corridors now stipulate the extent to which renewable energy is to be expanded in the future and the funding rates (feed-in tariffs) gradually will no longer be fixed by the government, but will be determined by auction.  Wind and solar power are to be targeted over hydro, gas (landfill gas, sewage gas, and mine gas), geothermal, and biomass.  In late 2015, this new scheme is being tested, as a pilot project, for ground-mounted PV installations. With the Renewable Energy Sources Act (2017), auctions will become commonplace for new installations also for most other types of renewables.

See also 

 Energiewende in Germany
 German Renewable Energy Sources Act, also known as the EEG

References 

Electric power in Germany
Law of Germany
Germany
Renewable energy in Germany

de:Erneuerbare-Energien-Gesetz
nl:Terugleververgoeding in Duitsland